Eleanor Audley ( Zellman; November 19, 1905 – November 25, 1991) was an American actress with a distinctive voice and a diverse body of work. She played Oliver Douglas's mother, Eunice Douglas, on the CBS sitcom Green Acres (1965–1969), and provided Disney animated features with the voices of the two villain characters, Lady Tremaine, Cinderella’s evil stepmother in Cinderella (1950), and Maleficent, the wicked fairy in Sleeping Beauty (1959). She had roles in live-action films, but was most active in radio programs such as My Favorite Husband as Liz Cooper's mother-in-law, Mrs. Cooper, and Father Knows Best as the Anderson family's neighbor, Mrs. Smith.  Audley's television appearances include those in I Love Lucy, The Dick Van Dyke Show, The Beverly Hillbillies, Mister Ed, My Three Sons and Hazel.

Early and personal life
Eleanor Zellman was born in Newark, New Jersey on November 19, 1905. Her family had moved to West 86th Street in Manhattan, New York City, by 1917.

Zellman began using the stage-name "Eleanor Audley" sometime before 1940.

A Democrat, she supported Adlai Stevenson's campaign during the 1952 presidential election.

Career

Stage and radio
Audley made her Broadway debut in the 1926 production of Howdy, King.  Her other stage appearances included On Call (1928–1929); Pigeons and People (1933); Thunder on the Left (1933); Kill That Story (1934); Ladies' Money (1934); Susan and God (1937–1938–1943); and In Bed We Cry (1944).

Audley worked extensively in the 1940s and 1950s in radio, notably playing Liz Cooper's aristocratic mother-in-law, Mrs. Cooper, who typically looks down on her, on My Favorite Husband (the role was initially played by Bea Benaderet), and the Anderson family's neighbor, Mrs. Smith, on Father Knows Best.  In addition, Audley performed on radio as a series regular on Escape, Suspense, The Story of Dr. Kildare, Romance, Lux Radio Theatre, The Railroad Hour and Yours Truly, Johnny Dollar. She played the stepmother in re-imaginings of the Cinderella story that were included in episodes of the series Hallmark Playhouse, and the weekly western series, The Six Shooter, that starred James Stewart.

Film and animation
Audley's onscreen appearance was as a parole board member in the 1949 noir film The Story of Molly X starring June Havoc.  Other film appearances followed, including: Pretty Baby (1950); Gambling House (1951); Cell 2455, Death Row (1955); The Unguarded Moment (1956); Full of Life (1956); Spoilers of the Forest (1957); Home Before Dark (1958); a cameo as the mother and slain victim of suspect Jack Graham in The FBI Story (1959); The Second Time Around (1961); and Hook, Line and Sinker (1969).

In the animated film industry, Audley provided her distinctive voice to Lady Tremaine, Cinderella's evil stepmother, in the 1950 Disney film Cinderella; and Princess Aurora's evil fairy nemesis, Maleficent, in Disney's 1959 version of Sleeping Beauty.  For those films, animators Frank Thomas and Marc Davis designed the characters' facial features and expressions to be closely similar to Audley's.  In addition to providing their voices, she served as the performance model for both characters for live-action referencing to help the animators.  Audley had initially turned down the role of Maleficent because she was battling tuberculosis at the time.

Audley provided the voice for Madame Leota—the spirit of a psychic medium—in the Haunted Mansion attractions in Disneyland and Walt Disney World.

Television
Audley's first television appearance was in the pilot episode of The Mickey Rooney Show (also titled Hey Mulligan) as Bessie, a terrible actress who stars in an awful TV show.  From 1954 to 1970, she appeared regularly on television, including episodes of: The People's Choice; I Love Lucy; Crossroads; The Real McCoys; Richard Diamond, Private Detective; The Twilight Zone; Dennis the Menace; Mr. Lucky; Perry Mason; The Tab Hunter Show; Pete and Gladys; and Hazel.  Audley had recurring roles on The Dick Van Dyke Show as the P.T.A head Mrs. Billings, on The Beverly Hillbillies as the school headmistress Mrs. Potts, on Mister Ed as Wilbur Post's aunt Martha, on Pistols 'n' Petticoats as Mrs. Teaseley, on My Three Sons as Mrs. Vincent, and on Green Acres as Oliver Douglas's disapproving mother, Eunice Douglas, despite being only five months older than actor Eddie Albert who played the role of her son.

Death
Audley died from respiratory failure in 1991, six days after her 86th birthday. She is interred at Mount Sinai Memorial Park Cemetery in Los Angeles, California.

Filmography

Film

Television

 Studio 57 (1954) as Miss Anna Hunt
 The Pepsi-Cola Playhouse (1955)
 Front Row Center (1955) as Carlotta Vance
 Damon Runyon Theater (1955) as Cynthia
 Celebrity Playhouse (1955)
 Our Miss Brooks (1956) as Mrs. Maya Pryor
 The 20th Century-Fox Hour (1956) as Governor's Wife/Mrs. Lucy Hammond/Mrs. Julie Morgan
 Climax! (1956)
 Screen Directors Playhouse (1956) as Judith Brenner
 The People's Choice (1956) as Moderator/Mrs. Kimbeley "Kim" Price
 The Adventures of Jim Bowie (1956) as Miss Peabody
 Father Knows Best (1956) as Saleslady/Woman giving spare change (uncredited)/ Bookstacker in Library
 Crusader (1956) as Mrs. Erika Watson
 Cavalcade of America (1957) as Mrs. Stacey Littlefield
 Lux Video Theatre (1956) as Mrs. Sandy Lane, (1957) as Aunt Ada
 The Ford Television Theatre (1955) as Tina (1955), as Constance Perks (1957)
 I Love Lucy (1957) as Eleanor Spaulding/Flower Judge
 Crossroads (1957) as Mrs. Sophie Sand
 The Lineup (1957) as Maryanne Carstaires
 The Gray Ghost (1957) as Mrs. Joan Maddox
 How to Marry a Millionaire (1957) as Gertrude Van Dyne
 The Millionaire (1955) as Cynthia Semple, (1958) as Gloria Van Enger/Columnist
 Jane Wyman Presents The Fireside Theatre (1958) as Mrs. Emily Trumbull
 The Loretta Young Show (1954) as Miss Bennett, (1958) as Edith Landow
 The George Burns and Gracie Allen Show (1956) as The Lady Customer, (1957) as Mrs. Felicity Crowley/Mrs. Winthrop, (1958) as The Saleslady
 Frontier Doctor (1958) as Hattie Black
 The Old Testament Scriptures (1958) as Naomi
 The Real McCoys (1959) as Dr. Laurence Kirkwood
 The Ann Sothern Show (1959) as Mrs. Jenny Thompson
 Mike Hammer (1959) as Mrs. Wendy Milford
 Hennesey (1959)
 Richard Diamond, Private Detective (1959) as Mrs. Deneken
 General Electric Theatre (1954) as Woman in Restaurant, (1955–1956), (1959) as Alice Martin)
 The Twilight Zone (1960) as Mrs. Whitney (uncredited)
 Walt Disney Presents (1960) as Mrs. Annie Videau
 Johnny Midnight (1960) as Mrs. Mia Rice
 The Gale Storm Show: Oh! Susanna (1956) as Passenger, (1957) as Mrs. Michelle Gardiner, (1960) as Bess Pomeroy
 The Untouchables (1960) as Mrs. Micheline Cross
 The Man From Blackhawk (1960) as Comtesse De Vilon
 Dennis the Menace (1960) as Mrs. Andrea Pompton
 Peter Gunn (1960) as Laura Scott
 Mr. Lucky (1960) as Mrs. Alice Dubois
 Make Room for Daddy (1960) as Mrs. Anette Willoughby
 Shirley Temple's Storybook (1960) as Miss Felicity Collingwood
 Perry Mason (1958) as Lois Gilbert, (1960) as Headmistress Lorimer
 The Tab Hunter Show (1961) as Columnist
 The Tom Ewell Show (1961) as Madame Defarge
 The Best of the Post (1962) as Mrs. Jackie Hill (as Elinor Audley)
 Ichabod and Me (1962)
 The Many Loves of Dobie Gillis (1962) as Irma Lumpkin
 Pete and Gladys (1961) as Mrs. Linda Brenner, (1962) as Mrs. Elisa Clibber
 The Detectives (1962) as Liz Roberts
 The Joey Bishop Show (1961) as Mrs. Arianne Willoughby, (1962) as Fashion Announcer/Mrs. Penny Fitch as Clubwoman
 Have Gun - Will Travel (1960) as Cynthia Palmer, (1961) as School Teacher, (1963) as Mrs. Hannah Randolph Quincy
 The Dick Powell Theatre (1963) as Lady
 The Dick Van Dyke Show (1961) as Party Goer), (1962—1963) as Mrs. Peggy Billings
 The New Phil Silvers Show (1963) as Mrs. Allison Osborne
 Wagon Train (1958) as Mrs. Winston, (1961) as Mother Albright, (1963) as Minerva Ames
 McHale's Navy (1964) as Mrs. Millicent Hardsey
 The Beverly Hillbillies (1962-1963-1964) as Mrs. Millicent Schuyler-Potts
 Many Happy Returns (1964) as Mrs. Pernandina Atwood
 Bob Hope Presents The Chrysler Theatre (1964) as Mrs. Johnson/Lil Schaeffer/Buttercup Fuchisa
 Mister Ed (1961–1965) as Aunt Martha
 The Cara Williams Show (1965) as Mrs. Lorence Ashford
 The Farmer's Daughter (1964) as Simone, (1965) as Mildred
 The Man From U.N.C.L.E. (1965) as Mrs. Laura Farnham
 The Jack Benny Program (1965) as Mrs. Jeanna Lewis
 Kentucky Jones (1965) as Mrs. Winnona Edgerton
 Peyton Place (1965) as Miss Martha (uncredited)
 O.K. Crackerby! (1965) as Mrs. Ameila Willoughby
 Hazel (1961) as Customer, (1962) as Mrs. Totter, (1963) as Mrs. Loretta Green, (1965) as Mrs. Katie Hardy
 The Lucy Show (1965) as The Columnist
 The Big Valley (1965) as Mother Callahan
 My Brother the Angel (1965) as Mrs. Evelyne Ettinger
 The Bob Hope Specials (1956-1957-1966)
 Honey West (1966) as Mrs. Juniper Carlton Murdock
 Summer Fun (1966) as Mother-in-law
 The Phyllis Diller Show (1966) as Mrs. Elsa Fenwick
 Pistols 'n' Petticoats (1966–1967) as Mrs. Jenny Teasley
 Green Acres (1965–1969) as Mother Eunice Douglas
 My Three Sons (1969–1970) as Mrs. Beatrice Vincent
 The Wonderful World of Disney (1977) as Lady Tremaine (voice, archived)/Maleficent (voice, archived)
 Disney's Wonderful World (1979) as Matron (archived)
 Walt Disney (1983) as Lady Tremaine (voice, archived)/Maleficent (voice, archived)
 The Wonderful World of Disney (1998) as Maleficent (voice, archived)

Radio

 The Bishop and the Gargoyle (NBC special, July 14, 1940)
 Adventure Ahead (NBC Red, 1944)
 Words at War (NBC Red, 1945)
 The Eternal Light (NBC, 1945–1946)
 Encore Theatre (CBS, 1946)
 The Big Story (NBC, 1947)
 Escape (CBS, 1947–1948), episodes include "Back for Christmas" and "The Man Who Could Work Miracles"
 The Adventures of Ellery Queen (ABC, 1947–1948)
 Suspense (CBS, 1940s, not often credited), episodes include repeats of "Sorry, Wrong Number" and "The Man Who Wanted to Be Edward G. Robinson" (both 1948)
 Sealtest Variety Theatre (NBC, 1949)
 My Home Town (NBC, 1949)
 This Is Your FBI (ABC, 1949)
 Richard Diamond, Private Detective (NBC, 1949)
 NBC University Theatre (NBC, 1949)
 Pursuit (CBS, 1949)
 The Hotpoint Holiday Hour (CBS, 1949), "The Man Who Came to Dinner"
 The Whistler (CBS, 1948–1950)
 The Story of Dr. Kildare (syndicated, 1949–1950) as Molly Byrd
 The Life of Riley (NBC, 1950)
 The Halls of Ivy (NBC, 1950)
 The Adventures of Christopher London (NBC, 1950)
 The Saint (NBC, 1950)
 My Favorite Husband (CBS, 1949–1951) as Mrs. Leticia Cooper
 Screen Directors Playhouse (NBC, 1950–1951)
 Family Theatre (Mutual, 1950–1951)
 Hollywood Star Playhouse (CBS, 1951)
 Hallmark Playhouse (CBS, 1951), includes "The Story Of Cinderella"
 Night Beat (NBC, 1950–1952)
 Romance (CBS series, 1944–1954, not often credited), episodes include "Pride and Prejudice" and "The Long Way Home"
 Lux Radio Theatre (CBS, 1948–1954)
 The Railroad Hour (NBC, 1949–1954)
 Father Knows Best (NBC, 1949–1954) as Mrs. Elizabeth Smith
 The Six Shooter (NBC, 1953–1954) as Mrs. Abbey Ames
 Fibber McGee and Molly (NBC, 1954–1955)
 The CBS Radio Workshop (CBS, 1956–1957)
 Yours Truly, Johnny Dollar (CBS 1955–1960)

Theme parks
 Haunted Mansion as Madame Leota (voice)
 HalloWishes as Madame Leota (voice)

Discography
 Walt Disney's Snow White and the Seven Dwarfs (1949, RCA/Camden) as Evil Queen
 Walt Disney's Cinderella: Little Nipper Series (1949, RCA/Camden) as Lady Tremaine
 Walt Disney's Cinderella (1954, RCA/Camden) as Lady Tremaine
 The Story and Song from The Haunted Mansion (1969, Disneyland Records) as Madame Leota
 Disney Songs and Story: Sleeping Beauty (2012, Walt Disney Records) as Maleficent

Stage
 Howdy, King as guest in hotel, December 1926 to January 1927
 On Call as Mary Randall, November 1928 to January 1929
 Pigeons and People as Elinore Payne, January 1933 to November 1933
 Thunder on the Left as Ruth Brook, October 1933 to November 1933
 Kill That Story as Millicent, August 1934 to December 1934
 Ladies' Money as Claire Touhey, November 1934 to December 1934
 Susan and God as Charlotte Marley, October 1937 to June 1938, December 1943
 In Bed We Cry as Claire Dangerfield, November 1944 to December 23, 1944

References

External links

 
 
 
 
 RadioGOLDINdex listing

1905 births
1991 deaths
20th-century American actresses
Actresses from New York City
American radio actresses
American stage actresses
American television actresses
Burials at Mount Sinai Memorial Park Cemetery
Disney people
New Jersey Democrats
New York (state) Democrats
California Democrats
Jewish American actresses
20th-century American Jews